= Charlie's Cafe Exceptionale =

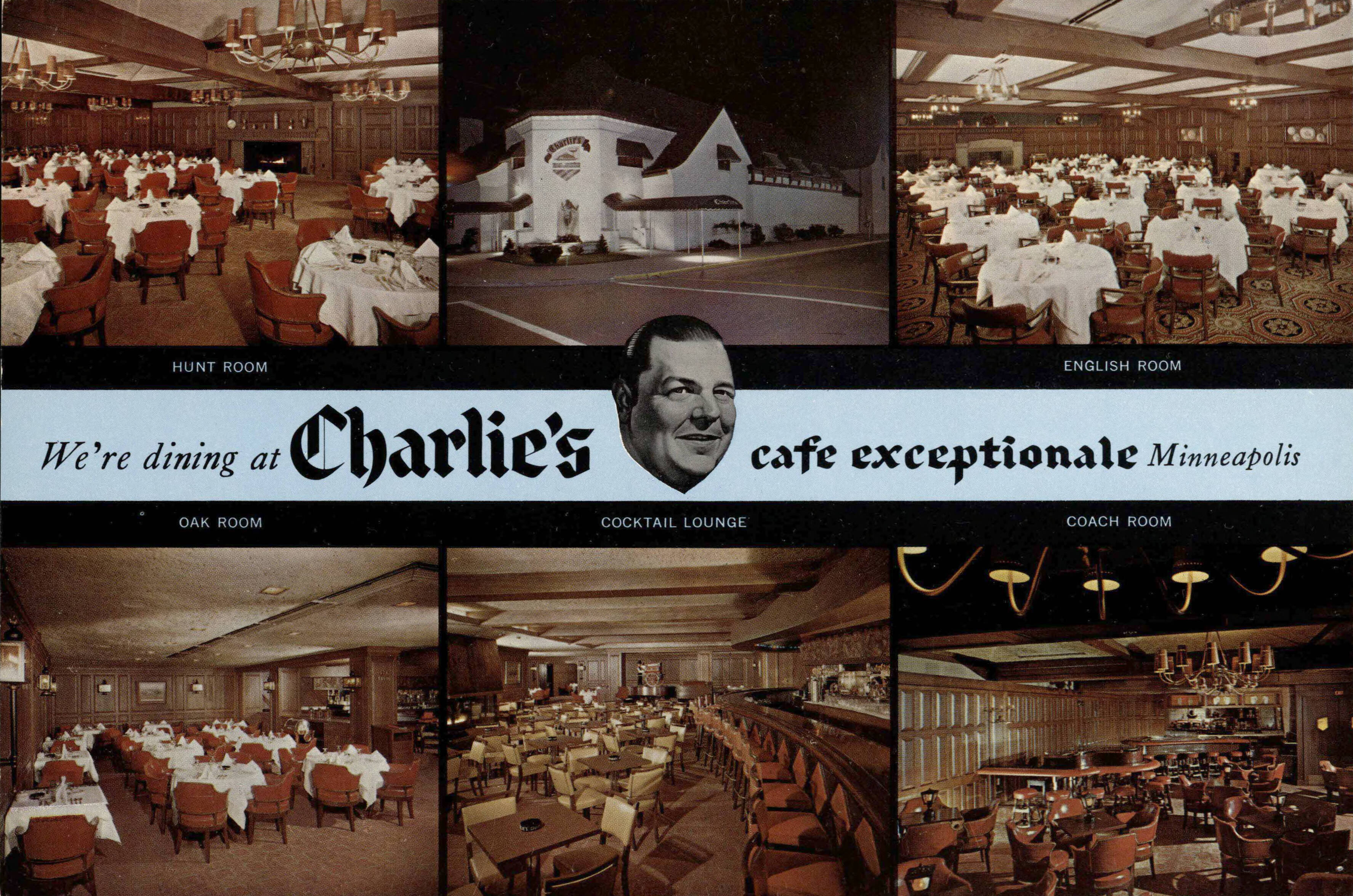
- Postcard of Charlie's Cafe Exceptionale

Restaurant information
- Established: 1933; 93 years ago
- Closed: July 21, 1982; 43 years ago
- Food type: American
- Location: 7th Street and 4th Avenue South, Minneapolis, Minnesota, 55401, United States

Charlie's Cafe Exceptionale was a large and successful restaurant in downtown Minneapolis, Minnesota from 1933 to its closing on July 21, 1982. It was located at 7th Street and 4th Avenue South and has been called Minneapolis's "most talked-about dining establishment" during its existence. It was owned and run by Charles Saunders until his death in 1964 (or 1962), and after that by his widow Louise Saunders until 1982.(Saunders' original partner was Charles "the Finn" Herlin, who died shortly after the restaurant opened.) Among the notable diners at the restaurant were Bob Hope, Jack Dempsey, and President Richard Nixon. The annual "Charlie Awards", honoring restaurants, restaurant dishes, and restaurant staff in the Twin Cities Minneapolis–Saint Paul metropolitan area of Minnesota are named after the restaurant.

In 1975 it had a capacity of 358-seats (221 in upstairs banquet rooms) and produced 320,000-meals-per-year, employed 175 people (with pay checks totaling more than $1 million each year in 1975 dollars) including 41 waitresses, 14 waiters, and four "captains". Its menu has been called "sophisticated-in-its-day", and "virtually everything" served was made "from scratch." The restaurant was known for its potato salad.

The restaurant featured a six-foot fountain statue of a water nymph near its front doors. Titled "Scherzo"—from the Italian musical term denoting a lively, playful movement—the statue was created by Harriet Frishmuth and was a gift to owner Charlie Sanders from a friend.
